"Real Life" is a song by American rock band Bon Jovi, released in 1999. It is taken from the soundtrack of the film EDtv.

Remix
A remix of the song is also present on the 100,000,000 Bon Jovi Fans Can't Be Wrong boxset. It reached the top 40 on the Radio & Records Airplay chart. At the time Hugh McDonald was an unofficial member of the band and this marked the only time that the bassist featured on a Bon Jovi release's artwork until his promotion to being an official member, when he featured on the artwork for the band's 2016 single "This House Is Not for Sale".

Track listings 
 CD1
 "Real Life" (Radio Mix) (Jon Bon Jovi, Desmond Child) – 3:47
 "Keep the Faith" (Live at Bon Jovi Christmas Concert, Count Basie Theatre, Red Bank, New Jersey, December 1992) – 6:39
 "Real Life" (Instrumental) – 4:55

 CD2
 Bon Jovi – "Real Life" (Radio Mix) – 3:47
 Muzzle – "Been Hurt" (Album Version) – 3:01
 Randy Edelman – "Streetwalkin' Ed" (Album Version) – 3;27

Charts

References 

Bon Jovi songs
1999 singles
Songs written by Desmond Child
Songs written by Jon Bon Jovi
Mercury Records singles
1999 songs
Music videos directed by Wayne Isham